Cassini may refer to:

People
 Cassini (surname)
 Oleg Cassini (1913-2006), American fashion designer

Cassini family:

 Giovanni Domenico Cassini (1625–1712), Italian mathematician, astronomer, engineer, and astrologer
 Jacques Cassini (1677–1756), French astronomer, son of Giovanni Domenico Cassini
 César-François Cassini de Thury (1714–1784), French astronomer and cartographer, son of Jacques Cassini
 Jean-Dominique, comte de Cassini (1748–1845), French astronomer, son of César-François Cassini de Thury
 Alexandre Henri Gabriel de Cassini (1781–1832), French botanist and naturalist, son of Jean-Dominique de Cassini

Planetary science
 Cassini's laws on the motion of the Moon
 Cassini Division, a gap in the rings of Saturn
 Cassini–Huygens, the space mission to examine Saturn and its moons, of which the Cassini orbiter was a part
 Cassini (Martian crater)
 Cassini (lunar crater)
 24101 Cassini, an asteroid
 24102 Jacquescassini, another asteroid
 Cassini Regio, the dark region of the moon Iapetus

Other uses
 Cassini, South Australia
 Cassini oval, a mathematical curve described by Giovanni Cassini
 Cassini projection, in map making
 Cassini Glacier, in Antarctica
 Cassini periodical cicadas, two species of insect
 French cruiser Cassini, French Navy cruiser

See also 
 Casini, a surname